Białki may refer to the following places:
Białki, Siedlce County in Masovian Voivodeship (east-central Poland)
Białki, Wołomin County in Masovian Voivodeship (east-central Poland)
Białki, Podlaskie Voivodeship (north-east Poland)
Białki, Pomeranian Voivodeship (north Poland)